Syrianus (Syrianos; died c. 437 A.D.) was a Greek Neoplatonist philosopher, and head of Plato's Academy in Athens, succeeding his teacher Plutarch of Athens in 431/432 A.D. He is important as the teacher of Proclus, and, like Plutarch and Proclus, as a commentator on Plato and Aristotle. His best-known extant work is a commentary on the Metaphysics of Aristotle. He is said to have written also on the De Caelo and the De Interpretatione of Aristotle and on Plato's Timaeus.

Life
He was a native of Alexandria, Egypt and the son of Philoxenus. We know little of his personal history, but that he came to Athens, and studied with great zeal under Plutarch of Athens, the head of the Neoplatonist school, who regarded him with great admiration and affection, and appointed him as his successor. He is important as the teacher of Proclus and Hermias. Proclus regarded him with the greatest veneration, and gave directions that at his death he should be buried in the same tomb with Themistius.

Writings
Only a little remains of the writings of Syrianus, the surviving works are:
A Commentary on Aristotle's Metaphysics.
Commentaries on two rhetorical works by Hermogenes.
Lectures on Plato's Phaedrus, preserved by Hermias.

Among the lost works, Syrianus wrote commentaries on Aristotle's De Caelo and De Interpretatione. We learn from the commentary of Proclus on the Timaeus of Plato that Syrianus also wrote a commentary on the same book. Syrianus also wrote works on The Theology of Orpheus, and On the Harmony of Orpheus, Pythagoras and Plato with the Oracles. Theodorus Meliteniota, in his Prooemium in Astronomiam, mentions commentaries on the Magna Syntaxis of Ptolemy by the philosopher Syrianus. The Suda attributes several works to Syrianus, but which are in fact the works of Proclus.

Philosophy
Syrianus' philosophical significance lies in the field of metaphysics and the exegesis of Plato. He is important in expanding the details of the Neoplatonist metaphysical system begun by Iamblichus and
most completely delineated by Proclus.

The most valuable remains that we possess are the commentaries on the Metaphysics of Aristotle. In explaining the propositions of Aristotle, he appends the views held by the Neoplatonist school on the subject in hand, and endeavours to establish the latter against the former. In his Metaphysics commentary Syrianus explains his view of the Monad and the Dyad in a number of places. The One is immediately followed by a supreme monad and dyad. Syrianus describes the monad as masculine and the dyad as feminine. He employs the doctrine of the two cosmic principles to explain the origin of evil. He denies that there are Platonic forms of things which are evil or base. The dyad is indirectly responsible for evil. Syrianus attributes the existence of evil to otherness and plurality, which he believes the dyad is directly responsible for creating.

One of his fundamental principles is that it is a proposition of general applicability that the same cannot be both affirmed and denied at the same time of the same thing; but that in any sense involving the truth of either the affirmation or the denial of a proposition, it applies only to existing things, but not to that which transcends speech and knowledge, for this admits neither of affirmation nor of denial, since every assertion respecting it must be false. On the whole, the doctrines laid down in this work are those of the Neoplatonist school.

Editions
J. Dillon, D. O'Meara, (2006), Syrianus: On Aristotle Metaphysics 13-14. Duckworth.
D. O'Meara, J. Dillon, (2008), Syrianus: On Aristotle Metaphysics 3-4. Duckworth.

Notes

Sources
 Angela Longo (ed.), Syrianus et la métaphysique de l'antiquité tardive: actes du colloque international, Université de Gèneve, 29 septembre-1er octobre 2006. (Napoli, Bibliopolis, 2009) (Elenchos, 51).
 Sarah Klitenic Wear, The Teachings of Syrianus on Plato's Timaeus and Parmenides. Ancient Mediterranean and Medieval Texts and Contexts (Leiden; Boston: Brill, 2011) (Studies in Platonism, Neoplatonism and the Platonic tradition, 10).

External links

Raw Greek OCR of Rabe's Teubner edition of Syrianus' Commentaria in Hermogenem at the Lace project of Mount Allison University:  vol. 1

5th-century Byzantine people
5th-century philosophers
Commentators on Aristotle
Commentators on Plato
Greek educators
Neoplatonists
Neoplatonists in Athens
Ancient Roman philosophers
Year of birth unknown
Year of death unknown
437 deaths
5th-century Byzantine writers
Late-Roman-era pagans